Isaac Daniel "Izak" Buys (born 4 February 1895, death date 9 Oct 1946 in the Grootte Schuur Hospital, Cape Town (after his death his body was donated to the medical school of the University of Cape Town ) was a South African cricketer.

A left-arm fast-medium bowler, Izak Buys was born in Somerset East, Cape Colony, South Africa, on 4 February 1895. The date of his death is unknown and there was no obituary in Wisden.

He played first-class cricket for Western Province from 1921–22 to 1923–24, and also played one Test for South Africa, the First Test against England in 1922-23 at Johannesburg. He scored 0 and 4 not out and failed to take a wicket. A few weeks earlier he had taken 5 for 121 and 2 for 22 for Western Province against the tourists; all seven wickets were of noted batsmen. He also played for South Africa in the third match of the five-match series against S. B. Joel's XI in 1924-25, taking the first three wickets in the first innings. It was his last first-class match.

His batting was poor – in 19 visits to the crease in his 12 first-class matches he never reached double figures – but he was an effective opening bowler. Three times he took five wickets in an innings, once per season from 1921–22 to 1923–24. His best figures were 6 for 49 at Johannesburg in a Currie Cup match against Border in December 1923, when he also took two catches in the first innings and 3 for 87 in the second innings.

References

Sources
  World Cricketers - A Biographical Dictionary by Christopher Martin-Jenkins, Oxford University Press (1996)
  The Wisden Book of Test Cricket, Volume 1 (1877-1977) compiled and edited by Bill Frindall, Headline Book Publishing (1995)
° https://familysearch.org/ark:/61903/3:1:33SQ-G5N4-9R3Z?i=3765&cc=1779109

External links

1895 births
Year of death missing
South Africa Test cricketers
South African cricketers
Western Province cricketers
People from Somerset East
Cricketers from the Eastern Cape